Sir Harold James Reckitt JP MP (5 May 1868 – 29 December 1930) was a British Liberal Party politician. He was the Member of Parliament (MP) for  Pontefract from February to June, 1893. He was MP for Brigg from 1895 to 1907.

Background and education
He was born the eldest son of Sir James Reckitt and Kathleen Saunders. He was the grandson of Isaac Reckitt (1792–1862), the founder of Reckitt & Sons consumer goods business. He was educated at Oliver's Mount School, Scarborough and King's College, Cambridge. In 1892 he qualified as a Barrister. In 1899 he married Christine Thomazia Howden in Kensington, they were divorced. In 1908 he married Julia Conner.

Political service
In 1892 Reckitt was appointed a Justice of the Peace for the East Riding of Yorkshire. In 1892 he first stood for parliament as Liberal candidate for Thirsk & Malton at the general election, coming second. In February 1893, he was Liberal candidate in the by-election caused by the Tory MP going to the Lords. He gained the seat by 63 votes. However, in May, following a petition organised by his defeated opponent, the election was ruled void and Reckitt was prevented from contesting the June by-election. In December 1894 he was Liberal candidate for Brigg at a by-election. He was unable to hold this Liberal seat, losing by 77 votes.  In August 1895 at the general election, he re-gained Brigg from the Tories. In 1897 he became Secretary of the political committee of the National Liberal Club as part of a take-over by the radicals. In 1898-99 he served as Sheriff of Hull. He went on to retain Brigg at the general elections in 1900 and 1906. In January 1907 he resigned his seat.

During the First World War in 1915, with Lady Johnstone, he founded a military hospital in France in Ris-Orangis called "Hôpital Militaire Johnstone-Reckitt". The hospital was closed after the war but a street named "Rue Johnstone et Reckitt" still exists in Ris-Orangis.

In 1924, after a break of eighteen years, he was Liberal candidate for Shoreditch at the general election. In a straight fight with Labour he came second, losing by 1,860 votes. In 1929 he again contested Shoreditch but on this occasion a Tory intervened. Reckitt came a comfortable second, but some distance behind the Labour candidate.

Electoral record

See also
Reckitt baronets

References

External links 
 

1868 births
1930 deaths
UK MPs 1892–1895
UK MPs 1895–1900
UK MPs 1900–1906
UK MPs 1906–1910
Liberal Party (UK) MPs for English constituencies
Baronets in the Baronetage of the United Kingdom
Reckitt family